Tim Lowly (born 1958 in Hendersonville, North Carolina) is a Chicago artist, musician, and teacher.  He is known for compassionate egg tempera pictures of children in mysterious circumstances.

Biography
Tim Lowly was born Tim Grubbs.  From the age of three he lived in South Korea, where his parents were Presbyterian missionaries.  He learned piano and guitar and still plays and composes folk-rock music.  Lowly attended Calvin College in Grand Rapids, Michigan, majoring in art.  He married Sherrie Rubingh in 1981, and rather than subordinate anyone's last name, they changed their surname to Lowly.

Career
After a visit to Korea and Europe, Lowly took up the exacting renaissance art of egg tempera painting, in which egg yolk is mixed with pigment to make paint. Since 2000 Lowly had primarily worked with matte acrylic.

The Lowlys had a daughter, Temma, in 1985, who was brain-damaged and is frequently the subject of Mr. Lowly's paintings.  Lowly says, "Part of my fairly political agenda is to say that disabled children are a part of life.  These are not freaks.  What I'm saying is that we should advocate for eyes of compassion that see human beings as human beings, rather than separating them into the beautiful, the ugly, the normal, the freak."

Lowly has been awarded an Individual Artist Grant from the Michigan Council for the Arts in 1987 and Fellowships in Visual Art from the Illinois Arts Council in 1995 and 2005.  He teaches at North Park University in Chicago.

Collections
The Arkansas Art Center, Little Rock, Arkansas
Calvin University, Grand Rapids, Michigan
Columbus State University, Columbus, Georgia
Davidson College, Davidson, North Carolina
Frye Museum, Seattle, Washington
The Graham Center Museum, Wheaton College, Wheaton, Illinois
Grand Valley State University, Grand Rapids, Michigan
The Grunwald Center for the Graphic Arts, UCLA, Los Angeles
The Kalamazoo Institute of Arts, Kalamazoo, Michigan
The Kresge Art Museum, East Lansing, Michigan
The McDonald's Corporate Collection, Oak Brook, Illinois
The Metropolitan Museum of Art, New York
The Minneapolis Institute of Art, Minneapolis, Minnesota
Millikin University, Decatur, Illinois
The Rockford Art Museum, Rockford, Illinois
The Charles A. Wustum Museum of Fine Arts, Racine, Wisconsin

References

External links
  Tim Lowly's website

1958 births
20th-century American painters
American male painters
21st-century American painters
21st-century American male artists
Christian artists
Performers of contemporary Christian music
American singer-songwriters
American performers of Christian music
Living people
20th-century American male artists